The Vilsmeier–Haack reaction (also called the Vilsmeier reaction) is the chemical reaction of a substituted amide (1) with phosphorus oxychloride and an electron-rich arene (3) to produce an aryl aldehyde or ketone (5). The reaction is named after Anton Vilsmeier and Albrecht Haack. 

For example, benzanilide and dimethylaniline react with phosphorus oxychloride to produce an unsymmetrical diaryl ketone. Similarly, anthracene is formylated at the 9-position. The reaction of anthracene with N-methylformanilide, also using phosphorus oxychloride, gives 9-anthracenecarboxaldehyde:

Reaction mechanism 
The reaction of a substituted amide with phosphorus oxychloride gives a substituted chloroiminium ion (2), also called the Vilsmeier reagent. The initial product is an iminium ion (4b), which is hydrolyzed to the corresponding ketone or aldehyde during workup.

See also
 Formylation reaction

Further reading

References 

Addition reactions
Name reactions
Formylation reactions